Christopher Karns (born January 25, 1979) is an American turntablist, who won the 2011 DMC World DJ Championships. He has also won the 2002 WSTC World Championships, six DMC Regional Championships, and three Redbull Thre3style Championships.

He has produced songs for Ahmad and Mayer Hawthorne. Chris has also shared stages around the world with industry legends such as Run-D.M.C., A Tribe Called Quest, Common, Mos Def, and many others. He is currently the official touring DJ for Yelawolf and has started playing sets with Pretty Lights.

In April 2013, he auditioned as one of the nineteen contestants for the third season of VH1's DJ reality show, Master of the Mix. Despite making it to the finals with DJ Jayceeoh and DJ Incrediboi, he lost and became a runner-up with DJ Incrediboi.

References

External links

1979 births
American hip hop DJs
Record producers from Colorado
Living people
Mixtape DJs
Musicians from Denver
Remixers